Spišský Štiavnik is a village and municipality in Poprad District in the Prešov Region of northern Slovakia.

Geography
The municipality lies at an altitude of 567 metres and covers an area of 18.364 km². It has a population of about 2150 people.

History
In historical records the village was first mentioned in 1246.

Famous people
Tibor Frešo, composer and conductor
Prof. Martin Slivka, ethnography director

Infrastructure and economy
Cultural sightseeing is a building of former spas from the 19th century. In the Spišský Štiavnik is multi course as well as football and horse racing clubs.

References

External links
http://www.spisskystiavnik.sk

Villages and municipalities in Poprad District
Spiš